The  is an electric multiple unit (EMU) train type operated by West Japan Railway Company (JR West) on Haruka limited express services to and from Kansai International Airport.

Design
The trains inherit some of design elements of the 281 series currently used on Haruka services, such as its livery, the Haruka branding and the "square dot" logos.

Formations
The trains are formed as three-car sets, and will be coupled to 281 series units in order to form nine-car trains. The 271 series trains are formed as follows.

Interior
The interior features a 2+2 seating arrangement with rotating and reclining seats, AC power outlets on all seats, as well as dedicated luggage spaces. Multilingual passenger informations are provided on displays above the doors.

History
On 21 June 2019 JR West announced the introduction of new 271 series trains on Haruka limited express services. The order for 18 cars was worth 6 billion yen. The first train was unveiled at the Kinki Sharyo head office on 10 July 2019. The trains entered revenue service on 14 March 2020, but due to the outbreak of the COVID-19 pandemic and the subsequent drop of air travelers, JR West decided to postpone lengthening the Haruka trains to nine cars. 

Currently, all Haruka trains are still formed in six car sets, with nine-car services intended to resume when air travel goes back to normal. The sets re-entered service on 13 March 2021 with the introduction of that year's revised timetable when various Haruka sets resumed 9-car operation.

References

External links

 JR West press release 

Electric multiple units of Japan
West Japan Railway Company
Kinki Sharyo multiple units
1500 V DC multiple units of Japan